Manuel Gava (born 20 February 1991) is a German-Italian politician of the Social Democratic Party (SPD) who has been Member of the German Bundestag for Osnabrück City since 2021.

Early life and education
Gava was born in Pieve di Cadore in Italy. After moving to Germany, he grew up in Taunusstein in Hesse.

Political career
In parliament, Gava has been serving on the Committee on Labour and Social Affairs and the Committee on Economic Cooperation and Development.

In addition to his committee assignments, Gava is part of the German-Italian Parliamentary Friendship Group, the German-Brazilian Parliamentary Friendship Group and the German Parliamentary Friendship Group for Relations with the Andean States.

Within his parliamentary group, Gave is part of a working group on migration and integration and chairs a discussion group on Latin America and the Caribbean.

Other activities
 German United Services Trade Union (ver.di), Member
 VfL Osnabrück, Member

See also 

 List of members of the 20th Bundestag

References 

1991 births
Living people
21st-century German politicians
People from the Province of Belluno
People from Rheingau-Taunus-Kreis
People from Osnabrück
German people of Italian descent
Italian emigrants to Germany

Members of the Bundestag for Lower Saxony
Members of the Bundestag for the Social Democratic Party of Germany
Members of the Bundestag 2021–2025